The 2010–11 Asia League Ice Hockey season was the eighth season of Asia League Ice Hockey. Seven teams participated in the league. The Tohoku Free Blades and Anyang Halla were named co-champions due to the Japan earthquake.

Regular season

Playoffs 

The finals were canceled due to the earthquake in Tohoku. Tohoku Free Blades and Anyang Halla were co-champions for 2010–11 Asia League Ice Hockey season.

External links
 Asia League Ice Hockey

Asia League Ice Hockey
Asia League Ice Hockey seasons
Asia